Sadikpur is a village in the Siwan District of Bihar, India. It is situated on the Pachrukhi - Tarwara state highway.

References

Villages in Siwan district